Teghnit-e Olya (also Romanized as Teghnīt-e ‘Olyā; also known as Teghnīt-e Bālā) is a village in Chaldoran-e Jonubi Rural District, in the Central District of Chaldoran County, West Azerbaijan Province, Iran. At the 2006 census, its population was 109, in 20 families.

References 

Populated places in Chaldoran County